This article lists the winners and nominees for the NAACP Image Award for Outstanding Actress in a Motion Picture. The award has also been called Outstanding Lead Actress in a Motion Picture. Out of 12 films which featured African-Americans in leading roles in 1980, Cicely Tyson was the only female in that category. She played opposite Richard Pryor in Bustin' Loose. Because of this, she and officials at the annual NAACP Image Awards program decided that she should not accept the award.

Winners and nominees
For each year in the tables below, the winner is listed first and highlighted in bold.

1960s

1970s

1980s

1990s

2000s

2010s

2020s

Multiple wins and nominations

Wins

 5 wins
 Angela Bassett

 4 wins
 Viola Davis
 Whoopi Goldberg

 2 wins
 Halle Berry
 Taraji P. Henson
 Cicely Tyson
 Sanaa Lathan

Nominations

 11 nominations
 Halle Berry

 9 nominations
 Angela Bassett

 7 nominations
 Viola Davis
 Whoopi Goldberg

 6 nominations
 Queen Latifah
 Alfre Woodard

 5 nominations
 Sanaa Lathan

 4 nominations 
 Taraji P. Henson
 Zoe Saldana

 3 nominations
 Rosalind Cash
 Rosario Dawson
 Pam Grier
 Vivica A. Fox
 Whitney Houston
 Nia Long
 Keke Palmer
 Kerry Washington

 2 nominations
 Jennifer Beals
 Beyoncé
 Ruby Dee
 Kimberly Elise
 Robin Givens
 Jennifer Hudson
 Janet Jackson
 Regina King
 Amandla Stenberg
 Jada Pinkett Smith
 Tessa Thompson
 Beverly Todd
 Cicely Tyson
 Gabrielle Union
 Quvenzhané Wallis
 Vanessa Williams

References

NAACP Image Awards
Film awards for lead actress